Martin Mitkov Mihaylov (born 24 July 2000) is a Bulgarian footballer who plays as a defender for Bulgarian First League club Hebar Pazardzhik.

Club career
Mihaylov spent his youth years at the academy of Slavia Sofia to 2018. 
Made his debut in men's football for the Pirin Razlog team, then played for Kyustendil and Sportist Svoge
On June 11, 2021, he signed with Hebar Pazardzhik.

References

External links

2000 births
Living people
Sportspeople from Bjelovar
Bulgarian footballers
Association football midfielders
FC Hebar Pazardzhik players
First Professional Football League (Bulgaria) players